Herman van den Engel (23 November 1918 – 27 August 2003) was a Dutch footballer. He played in one match for the Netherlands national football team in 1940.

References

1918 births
2003 deaths
Dutch footballers
Netherlands international footballers
Place of birth missing
Association football midfielders
Willem II (football club) players